Fallet may refer to:

People
 Nicolas Fallet (1746–1801), French playwright and journalist
 René Fallet (1927–1983), French screenwriter

Other
Fallet (TV series), Swedish television series
Döda Fallet, extinct whitewater rapid